Lubayn (also spelled Lubbein) is a village in the al-Suwayda Governorate in southwestern Syria. It is situated in the southern part of the Lejah plateau, northwest of the city of al-Suwayda. Lubayn had a population of 1,730 in the 2004 census. Its inhabitants are Druze.

History
There are Byzantine-era (4th-6th centuries CE) ruins in Lubayn. 

In 1596 it appeared in the Ottoman tax registers as Libbin and was part of the nahiya of Bani Abdullah in the Sanjak Hauran. It had an entirely Muslim population consisting of 20 households and 7 bachelors. They paid a fixed tax-rate of 40% on agricultural products, including wheat, barley, summer crops, goats and beehives; the taxes totalled 3,200 akçe.

The modern-day village was established by Druze from the Murshid family sometime between 1867 and 1883.

See also
 Druze in Syria

References

Bibliography

External links
 Map of the town, Google Maps
Ezra-map, 20M

19th-century establishments in the Ottoman Empire
Archaeological sites in as-Suwayda Governorate
Druze communities in Syria
Populated places in Shahba District